The Crockett County Courthouse is a historic courthouse built in 1902 at 907 Ave D, Ozona, Texas, United States. The Second Empire style building was designed by Oscar Ruffini of San Angelo. It was added to the National Register of Historic Places on December 27, 1974.

Crockett County was organized in 1891 and named after Davy Crockett. The first courthouse was a wood-frame structure built in 1891. The building served the county until 1902 when the present hand cut native limestone courthouse and jail were built. The estimated cost of the courthouse was $30,000 paid for by bonds issued by the county. In its first few decades of existence, the two-story structure also served as a community center for social events and weekly dances.

See also

National Register of Historic Places listings in Crockett County, Texas
List of county courthouses in Texas

References

External links

County courthouses in Texas
Courthouses on the National Register of Historic Places in Texas
Buildings and structures in Crockett County, Texas
Second Empire architecture in Texas
Texas State Antiquities Landmarks
Recorded Texas Historic Landmarks
National Register of Historic Places in Crockett County, Texas